A congregation is a term used in some institutions, especially in the United Kingdom, for a formal meeting of a university, particularly for awarding degrees, and thus, by extension, the name of the graduation ceremony at those universities. These include congregations of the Regent House at the University of Cambridge, congregations of the university at Durham University, degree congregations at the University of Birmingham, and the University of Warwick, and simply congregations at the University of Kent and Northumbria University.

At the University of Oxford, congregation is the name of the sovereign governing body.

See also
University council
Academic senate
General Council (Scottish university)

References

Academic terminology
Terminology of the University of Oxford
Terminology of the University of Cambridge
Graduation